The , frequently abbreviated to LDP or , is a conservative political party in Japan.

The LDP was formed in 1955 as a merger of two conservative parties; the Liberal Party and the Japan Democratic Party. Since its foundation, the LDP has been in power almost continuously—a period called the 1955 System—except between 1993 and 1994, and again from 2009 to 2012. In the 2012 election, it regained control of the government. After the 2021 and 2022 elections it holds 261 seats in the House of Representatives and 119 seats in the House of Councillors, and in coalition with Komeito since 1999, a governing majority in both houses. 

The LDP is often described as a big tent conservative party. While lacking a cohesive political ideology, the party's platform has historically supported increased defense spending and maintaining close ties with the United States. The party's history and internal composition have been characterized by intense factionalism ever since its emergence in 1955, with its parliamentary members currently split among six factions, each of which vies for influence in the party and the government. The incumbent Prime Minister and party President is Fumio Kishida, the leader of the party's moderate Kōchikai faction.

History

Beginnings

The party won the following elections, and Japan's first conservative government with a majority was formed by 1955. It would hold majority government until 1993.

The LDP began with reforming Japan's international relations, ranging from entry into the United Nations, to establishing diplomatic ties with the Soviet Union. Its leaders in the 1950s also made the LDP the main government party, and in all the elections of the 1950s, the LDP won the majority vote, with the only other opposition coming from left-wing politics, made up of the Japan Socialist Party and the Japanese Communist Party.

From the 1950s through the 1990s, the United States Central Intelligence Agency and Federal Bureau of Investigation spent millions of dollars attempting to influence elections in Japan to favor the LDP against more leftist parties such as the Socialists and the Communists, although this was not revealed until the mid-1990s when it was exposed by The New York Times.

1960s to 1990s
For the majority of the 1960s, the LDP (and Japan) were led by Eisaku Satō, beginning with the hosting of the 1964 Summer Olympics in Tokyo, and ending in 1972 with Japanese neutrality in the Vietnam War and with the beginning of the Japanese asset price bubble. By the end of the 1970s, the LDP went into its decline, where even though it held the reins of government many scandals plagued the party, while the opposition (now joined with the Kōmeitō (1962–1998)) gained momentum.

In 1976, in the wake of the Lockheed bribery scandals, a handful of younger LDP Diet members broke away and established their own party, the New Liberal Club (Shin Jiyu Kurabu). A decade later, however, it was reabsorbed by the LDP.

By the late 1970s, the Japan Socialist Party, the Japanese Communist Party, and the Komeito along with the international community used major pressure to have Japan switch diplomatic ties from Taiwan (Republic of China) to the People's Republic of China.

In 1983, the LDP was a founding member of the International Democrat Union.

The LDP managed to consistently win elections for over three decades, and the LDP's decades in power allowed it to establish a highly stable process of policy formation. This process would not have been possible if other parties had secured parliamentary majorities. LDP strength was based on an enduring, although not unchallenged, coalition of big business, small business, agriculture, professional groups, and other interests. Elite bureaucrats collaborated closely with the party and interest groups in drafting and implementing policy. In a sense, the party's success was a result not of its internal strength but of its weakness. It lacked a strong, nationwide organization or consistent ideology with which to attract voters. Its leaders were rarely decisive, charismatic, or popular. But it functioned efficiently as a locus for matching interest group money and votes with bureaucratic power and expertise. This arrangement resulted in corruption, but the party could claim credit for helping to create economic growth and a stable, middle-class Japan. 

Despite winning the 1986 general election by a landslide, by the end of 1980s, the LDP started to suffer setbacks in elections due to unpopular policies on trade liberalisation and tax, as well as a scandal involving their leader Sōsuke Uno and the Recruit scandal. The party lost its majority in the House of Councillors for the first time in 34 years in the 1989 election.

Out of power
The LDP managed to hold on to power in 1990 Japanese general election despite some losses. In 1993, the end of the miracle economy and other reasons such as the recruit scandal led to the LDP losing its majority in that year's general election.

Seven opposition parties—including several formed by LDP dissidents—formed a government headed by LDP dissident Morihiro Hosokawa of the Japan New Party who became the prime minister preceded by Kiichi Miyazawa. However, the LDP was still far and away the largest party in the House of Representatives, with well over 200 seats; no other party crossed the 80-seat mark. Yohei Kono became the president of the LDP preceded by Kiichi Miyazawa, he was the first non-prime minister LDP leader as the leader of the opposition.

In 1994, the Socialist Party and New Party Sakigake left the ruling coalition, joining the LDP in the opposition. The remaining members of the coalition tried to stay in power as a makeshift minority government, but this failed when the LDP and the Socialists, bitter rivals for 40 years, formed a majority coalition.  The new government was dominated by the LDP, but it allowed a Socialist to occupy the Prime Minister's chair (Tomiichi Murayama) until 1996 when the LDP's Ryutaro Hashimoto took over.

1996–2009
In the 1996 election, the LDP made some gains but was still 12 seats short of a majority.  However, no other party could possibly form a government, and Hashimoto formed a solidly LDP minority government.  Through a series of floor-crossings, the LDP regained its majority within a year.

The party was practically unopposed until 1998 when the opposition Democratic Party of Japan was formed. This marked the beginning of the opposing parties' gains in momentum, especially in the 2003 and 2004 Parliamentary Elections, that would not slow for another 12 years.

In the dramatically paced 2003 House of Representatives elections, the LDP won 237 seats, while the DPJ won 177 seats. In the 2004 House of Councillors elections, in the seats up for grabs, the LDP won 49 seats and the DPJ 50, though in all seats (including those uncontested) the LDP still had a total of 114. Because of this electoral loss, former Secretary-General Shinzo Abe turned in his resignation, but Party President Koizumi merely demoted him in rank, and he was replaced by Tsutomu Takebe.

On 10 November 2003, the New Conservative Party (Hoshu Shintō) was absorbed into the LDP, a move which was largely because of the New Conservative Party's poor showing in the 2003 general election.  The LDP formed a coalition with the conservative Buddhist New Komeito (party founded by Soka Gakkai) from Obuchi Second shuffle Cabinet (1999–2000).

After a victory in the 2005 Japanese general election, the LDP held an absolute majority in the Japanese House of Representatives and formed a coalition government with the New Komeito Party. Shinzo Abe succeeded then-Prime Minister Junichirō Koizumi as the president of the party on 20 September 2006. The party suffered a major defeat in the election of 2007, however, and lost its majority in the upper house for the first time in its history.

The LDP remained the largest party in both houses of the Diet, until 29 July 2007, when the LDP lost its majority in the upper house.

In a party leadership election held on 23 September 2007, the LDP elected Yasuo Fukuda as its president. Fukuda defeated Tarō Asō for the post, receiving 330 votes against 197 votes for Aso. However Fukuda resigned suddenly in September 2008, and Asō became Prime Minister after winning the presidency of the LDP in a five-way election.

In the 2009 general election, the LDP was roundly defeated, winning only 118 seats—easily the worst defeat of a sitting government in modern Japanese history, and also the first real transfer of political power in the post-war era.  Accepting responsibility for this severe defeat, Aso announced his resignation as LDP president on election night.  Sadakazu Tanigaki was elected leader of the party on 28 September 2009, after a three-way race, becoming only the second LDP leader who was not simultaneously prime minister.

2009–present
The party's support continued to decline, with prime ministers changing rapidly, and in the 2009 House of Representatives elections the LDP lost its majority, winning only 118 seats, marking the only time they would be out of the majority other than a brief period in 1993. The party had some success in the 2010 House of Councilors election, netting 13 additional seats and denying the DPJ a majority. Abe became the president again in September 2012 after a five-way race. The LDP returned to power with its ally New Komeito after winning a clear majority in the lower house general election on 16 December 2012 after just over three years in opposition. Shinzo Abe became Prime Minister for the second time preceded by Yoshihiko Noda who was the leader of the DPJ.

In July 2015, the party pushed for expanded military powers to fight in foreign conflict through Shinzo Abe and the support of Komeito party.

Yoshihide Suga took over from Shinzo Abe in September 2020 after a three-way race. After Suga declined to run for re-election, successor Fumio Kishida led the party to an inevitable victory in the October 2021 Japanese general election after a four-way race.

Ideology and political stance

The LDP is usually associated with conservatism and Japanese nationalism. The party though has not espoused a well-defined, unified ideology or political philosophy, due to its long-term government, and has been described as a "catch-all" party. Its members hold a variety of positions that could be broadly defined as being to the right of main opposition parties. Many of its ministers, including current Prime Minister Fumio Kishida and former Prime Ministers Yoshihide Suga, Shinzo Abe are affiliated with the parliamentary league of Nippon Kaigi, an ultranationalist and traditionalist lobby group. In Japanese politics, the convention is to classify the Liberal Democratic Party and the Japanese Communist Party as occupying the conservative and progressive ends of the ideological spectrum respectively, however this classification faces challenges, especially among younger generations, after the 1990s.

Anti-South Korean sentiment 

The LDP's Japanese nationalism shows a pragmatic nature, divided internally into realist doves and nationalist hawks, as it considers China's strong economic position. However, South Korea has much weaker economic and national power than Japan, Japan's right-wing conservatives, including the LDP, show almost entirely hawkish diplomacy in South Korea. This causes great political friction with South Korean liberals with anti-imperialist sentiment toward China and Japan. VANK, a South Korean liberal-nationalist group, accused Japanese conservatives of apologizing only to China and not to South Korea for forced labor in World War II in July 2022. Almost all major South Korean media outlets point out that the LDP and its politicians have anti-Korean sentiment, and that the party's main support base is "Hate of South Korea". Western experts say that the conflict between the two countries intensifies the most when a conservative (mainly LDP) regime is established in Japan and a liberal (mainly DPK) regime is established in South Korea.

The 2019–2020 Japan–South Korea trade dispute was triggered by the Japanese government's exclusion of South Korea from the trade 'white list'. Germany's newspaper, Süddeutsche Zeitung criticized only the Japan's government, because the Japanese politicians and Japan's governments have never properly reflected on their historical perceptions related to Japanese war crimes in World War II. According to Michael J. Green in January 2022, presidential candidates in the 2022 South Korean presidential election are willing to improve relations with Japan, but Japanese political leaders are not willing to improve relations with South Korea.

Major LDP politicians tend to deny that comfort women were forced sexual slavery by the Empire of Japan.

Historical 
In the case of the LDP administration under the 1955 System in Japan, their degree of economic control was stronger than that of Western conservative governments; it was also positioned closer to social democracy. Since the 1970s, the oil crisis has slowed economic growth and increased the resistance of urban citizens to policies that favor farmers. To maintain its dominant position, the LDP sought to expand party supporters by incorporating social security policies and pollution measures advocated by opposition parties. It was also historically closely positioned to corporate statism.

Before the 1990s, the LDP was in a liberal-conservative and conservative-liberal position with a more moderate element of nationalism. The LDP opposed the JSP's socialist policy. However, after many liberals in the party left the party since the 1990s, the LDP is not classified as a liberal party.

Policies
During the 2021 general election the released LDP policy manifesto, titled "Create a new era together with you" included among other things support for:
 Wealth redistribution to revive the Japanese economy and empowering the middle class
 Tax breaks for corporations willing to raise wages
 Advance administrative reforms to facilitate digitalization
 High investment in science and technology and increased funds for university research
 Secure robust supply chains for critical materials, such as rare earths
 Continued development of nuclear fusion power generation, and expansion of renewable energy to achieve carbon neutrality by 2050
 Reaching UN 2030 Sustainable Development Goals targets
 Offer subsidies for enterprises if they move into new industries
 Electronic COVID-19 vaccine passports
 Expanding support for small and medium businesses hit by the COVID-19 pandemic 
 Constitutional amendment including the proposed Japanese constitutional referendum to formalize the current existence of the Japan Self-Defense Forces in Article 9 of the Constitution and creating an emergency response clause
 Raising Japan's defense budget from the current 1% to "two percent or more" of gross domestic product (GDP) and enhancing Japan's defense capabilities
 Advance understanding of LGBT rights, although the party is not in favor of same-sex marriage with 50% of its election candidates being "undecided" and those opposed largely outnumbering those in favor
 Acceptance of foreign workers and improving management to cover labor shortages
 Support Taiwan's bid to join the CPTPP agreement and WHO observer status
 Promoting further nuclear disarmament and nuclear nonproliferation

Structure
When the party has a parliamentary majority, the party president is the prime minister. The choice of party president is formally that of a party convention composed of Diet members and local LDP figures, but in most cases, they merely approved the joint decision of the most powerful party leaders. To make the system more democratic, Prime Minister Takeo Fukuda introduced a "primary" system in 1978, which opened the balloting to some 1.5 million LDP members. The process was so costly and acrimonious, however, that it was subsequently abandoned in favor of the old "smoke-filled room" method—so-called in allusion to the notion of closed discussions held in small rooms filled with tobacco smoke.

Leadership

As of 25 June 2021:

Factions

Since the genesis of the Liberal Democratic Party in 1955, factions have existed, but they have changed over time. Despite this change, factions in the party today can be traced back to their 1955 roots, a testament to the stability and institutionalized nature of Liberal Democratic Party factions. The party's history and internal composition have been characterized by intense factionalism ever since its emergence in 1955, with its parliamentary members currently split among six factions, each of which vies for influence in the party and the government. The incumbent Prime Minister and party President, Fumio Kishida, is the leader of the party's Kōchikai faction.

Current factions in the LDP include:
 Seiwa Seisaku Kenkyūkai (led by collective leadership)
 Shikōkai (led by Tarō Asō)
 Heisei Kenkyūkai (led by Toshimitsu Motegi)
 Kōchikai (led by Fumio Kishida)
 Shisuikai (led by Toshihiro Nikai)
 Kinmirai Seiji Kenkyūkai (led by Hiroshi Moriyama)
 Suigetsukai (led by Shigeru Ishiba)

Membership
The LDP had over five million party members in 1990. By December 2017 membership had dropped to approximately one million members.

Performance in national elections until 1993

Election statistics show that, while the LDP had been able to secure a majority in the twelve House of Representatives elections from May 1958 to February 1990, with only three exceptions (December 1976, October 1979, and December 1983), its share of the popular vote had declined from a high of 57.8 percent in May 1958 to a low of 41.8 percent in December 1976, when voters expressed their disgust with the party's involvement in the Lockheed scandal. The LDP vote rose again between 1979 and 1990. Although the LDP won an unprecedented 300 seats in the July 1986 balloting, its share of the popular vote remained just under 50 percent. The figure was 46.2 percent in February 1990. Following the three occasions when the LDP found itself a handful of seats shy of a majority, it was obliged to form alliances with conservative independents and the breakaway New Liberal Club. In a cabinet appointment after the October 1983 balloting, a non-LDP minister, a member of the New Liberal Club, was appointed for the first time. On 18 July 1993, in lower house elections, the LDP fell so far short of a majority that it was unable to form a government.

In the upper house, the July 1989 election represented the first time that the LDP was forced into a minority position. In previous elections, it had either secured a majority on its own or recruited non-LDP conservatives to make up the difference of a few seats.

The political crisis of 1988–89 was testimony to both the party's strength and its weakness. In the wake of a succession of issues—the pushing of a highly unpopular consumer tax through the Diet in late 1988, the Recruit insider trading scandal, which tainted virtually all top LDP leaders and forced the resignation of Prime Minister Takeshita Noboru in April (a successor did not appear until June), the resignation in July of his successor, Uno Sōsuke, because of a sex scandal, and the poor showing in the upper house election—the media provided the Japanese with a detailed and embarrassing dissection of the political system. By March 1989, popular support for the Takeshita cabinet as expressed in public opinion polls had fallen to 9 percent. Uno's scandal, covered in magazine interviews of a "kiss and tell" geisha, aroused the fury of female voters.

Uno's successor, the eloquent if obscure Kaifu Toshiki, was successful in repairing the party's battered image. By January 1990, talk of the waning of conservative power and a possible socialist government had given way to the realization that, like the Lockheed affair of the mid-1970s, the Recruit scandal did not signal a significant change in who ruled Japan. The February 1990 general election gave the LDP, including affiliated independents, a comfortable, if not spectacular, majority: 275 of 512 total representatives.

In October 1991, Prime Minister Kaifu Toshiki failed to attain passage of a political reform bill and was rejected by the LDP, despite his popularity with the electorate. He was replaced as prime minister by Miyazawa Kiichi, a long-time LDP stalwart. Defections from the LDP began in the spring of 1992, when Hosokawa Morihiro left the LDP to form the Japan New Party. Later, in the summer of 1993, when the Miyazawa government also failed to pass political reform legislation, thirty-nine LDP members joined the opposition in a no-confidence vote. In the ensuing lower house election, more than fifty LDP members formed the Shinseitō and the Sakigake parties, denying the LDP the majority needed to form a government.

Election results

Legislative results

House of Representatives

House of Councillors

Leadership elections

Logos

See also

History of Japan
Neoconservatism in Japan
Honebuto no hōshin
Komeito
Nippon Ishin no Kai
Japan Business Federation
Yomiuri Shimbun
The Asahi Shimbun – Historically closely related to Kōchikai (see Taketora Ogata, Ichiro Kono, Seiichi Tagawa and Tomisaburo Hashimoto). The Asahi Shimbun supports the Kishida administration.
Mainichi Shimbun – It has a historical relationship with the Heisei Kenkyukai (Keynesian principle). However, the relationship with the faction is not as strong as the Asahi Shimbun.
Nihon Keizai Shimbun
Sankei Shimbun – Historically closely related to Seiwakai
Netto-uyoku
Nippon Kaigi
Law and Justice (Poland)
People Power Party (South Korea)
Bharatiya Janata Party (India)
Liberal Party (Brazil, 2006) – This is another right-wing conservative party with "liberal" in its name.
Dentsu – Advertising agency (semi-governmental)
Unification Church
List of political parties in Japan
Politics of Japan
Reactionary (since 2012)

Notes

References

Japan Country Studies – Library of Congress

Bibliography
 
 
 Köllner, Patrick. "The Liberal Democratic Party at 50: Sources of Dominance and Changes in the Koizumi Era," Social Science Japan Journal (Oct 2006) 9#2 pp 243–257.
 Krauss, Ellis S., and Robert J. Pekkanen. "The Rise and Fall of Japan's Liberal Democratic Party," Journal of Asian Studies (2010) 69#1 pp 5–15, focuses on the 2009 election.
 Krauss, Ellis S., and Robert J. Pekkanen, eds. The Rise and Fall of Japan's LDP: Political Party Organizations as Historical Institutions (Cornell University Press; 2010) 344 pages; essays by scholars
 Scheiner, Ethan. Democracy without Competition in Japan: Opposition Failure in a One-Party Dominant State (Cambridge University Press, 2006)

External links

The official website of the LDP (Liberal Democratic Party) 

 
Politics of Japan
Political parties established in 1955
Political parties in Japan
1955 establishments in Japan
Anti-South Korean sentiment in Japan
Conservatism in Japan
Conservative parties in Japan
Historical revisionism of Comfort women
Japanese nationalists
Nationalist parties in Japan
National conservative parties
Social conservative parties
Identity politics in Japan
Right-wing parties in Asia
Right-wing populism in Japan
Right-wing populist parties